Sarah Torrans (born 14 February 1999) is an Irish field hockey player. She competed in the 2020 Summer Olympics.

References

External links
 Sarah Torrans at Hockey Ireland
 
 
 
 

1999 births
Living people
Sportspeople from Dublin (city)
Field hockey players at the 2020 Summer Olympics
Irish female field hockey players
Olympic field hockey players of Ireland